Pope Mark VI of Alexandria (Abba Marcos VI), 101st Pope of Alexandria & Patriarch of the See of St. Mark.

Pope Mark evidently entertained the Syrian Bishop Ahatallah for some time during his papacy. Bishop Ahatallah was in Cairo when Pope Pope Mark received a letter from Thomas, Archdeacon of the Saint Thomas Christian community of India asking for a new bishop in the face of Portuguese dominance. Unable or unwilling to send someone from his own church, Pope Mark evidently suggested that Bishop Ahatallah go to India instead.

Notes

References

17th-century Coptic Orthodox popes of Alexandria
1656 deaths